Uwe Beyer (14 April 1945  – 15 April 1993) was a West German hammer thrower. He competed at the 1964, 1968 and 1972 Olympics and won the bronze medal in 1964, representing the United Team of Germany, and later finished fourth in 1972 representing West Germany. He won the European title in 1971 and finished third in 1966 and fifth in 1974. Domestically Beyer won eight consecutive German titles in 1964–71, and received the Silbernes Lorbeerblatt in 1964. He also starred as Siegfried in Die Nibelungen (1966/1967 film). Beyer had a degree in physical education and in retirement ran a sports store in Mainz. His father Erich competed nationally in the shot put.

Beyer suffered a fatal heart attack while playing tennis in the Turkish beach resort of Belek, possibly as a delayed result of the use of anabolic steroids throughout his career, to which he freely admitted in a 1977 interview in the "Aktuelles Sportstudio" on ZDF.

References

1945 births
1993 deaths
German male hammer throwers
West German male hammer throwers
Olympic athletes of the United Team of Germany
Olympic athletes of West Germany
Olympic bronze medalists for the United Team of Germany
Athletes (track and field) at the 1964 Summer Olympics
Athletes (track and field) at the 1968 Summer Olympics
Athletes (track and field) at the 1972 Summer Olympics
European Athletics Championships medalists
Doping cases in athletics
German sportspeople in doping cases
Medalists at the 1964 Summer Olympics
Olympic bronze medalists in athletics (track and field)
Universiade medalists in athletics (track and field)
Universiade bronze medalists for West Germany
Medalists at the 1973 Summer Universiade
Sportspeople from Schleswig-Holstein
20th-century German people